Greece is characterized by an extremely fragmented, rugged landscape hosting a great diversity of ecosystems and an outstanding biodiversity. Almost 5% of its extensive coastline consists of ecologically sensitive wetlands. Two thirds of the total population live no further than 2 km from the coast and most of the important urban centers are coastal, while almost all of the tourist infrastructure is divided among islands and the coastal mainland.

Greek climate
Greece's climate is divided into three classes: A Mediterranean climate features mild, wet winters and hot, dry summers. Temperatures rarely reach extremes, although snowfalls do occur occasionally even in Athens, Cyclades or Crete during the winter. An alpine climate is found primarily in Western Greece (Epirus, Central Greece, Thessaly, Western Macedonia as well as central parts of the Peloponnese like Achaea, Arkadia and parts of Lakonia where the Alpine range pass by). A temperate climate is found in Central and Eastern Macedonia as well as in Thrace at places like Komotini, Xanthi and northern Evros; with cold, damp winters and hot, dry summers.

History and legislation
The tradition of protected areas in Greece dates back to Ancient Greek times and the Altis and sacred grove at Olympia, amongst other sanctuaries. In more recent times, the country's climatic and biological diversity, along with the rich flora and fauna that comes with it, made the need for the creation of national parks obvious as early as 1937, when the government of Ioannis Metaxas first issued a law that established national parks in Greece, Law 856/1937 On National Woodland Parks, itself building on the "protected forests" of the Forest Code of 1929. In 1938, the first national park was established, centred on Mount Olympus, followed later in the same year by a second, centred on Mount Parnassus. In 1986, the legal framework was overhauled by Law 1650/1986, Article 19 of which provides for the following types of protected area:
 Absolute Nature Reserves Areas
 Nature Reserve Areas
 National Parks
 Protected Natural Formations, Protected Landscapes and Landscape Elements
 Eco-development Areas

Among the National Parks, according to Article 19 Section 3, where a National Park (εθνικό πάρκο) has a predominantly marine or forested character, it may become a National Marine Park (θαλάσσιο πάρκο) or National Woodland Park (εθνικός δρυμός).

List of national parks
According to the World Database on Protected Areas, as of May 2022, there are 10 National Woodland Parks (εθνικοί δρυμοί), 2 National Marine Parks (θαλάσσια πάρκα), and 15 National Parks (εθνικά πάρκα).

National Woodland Parks

National Marine Parks

National Parks

Layout
Each national park consists of a core and the area surrounding it. The surrounding area must be larger than, or at least equal to, the size of the core.

In the core of the national park, only scientific research, mild recreational activities, and the acquiring of environment related information are permitted. The creation of menageries, fish farms, the building of roads, outposts, camping and hiking infrastructures, along with woodcutting infrastructures and pastures are permitted in the surrounding area of the national park.

See also

 List of Ramsar sites in Greece
 Wildlife of Greece

References

 
Greece
National parks
National parks